The results of elections in the state of New York have tended to be more Democratic-leaning than in most of the United States, with in recent decades a solid majority of Democratic voters, concentrated in New York City and some of its suburbs, including Westchester County, Rockland County and Long Island's Nassau county, and in the cities of Buffalo, Rochester, Syracuse, Albany, and Ithaca.

Republican voters, in the minority, are concentrated in more rural Upstate New York, particularly in the Adirondack Mountains, the Alleghany Mountains, Central New York, and in parts of the Hudson Valley, particularly in Putnam County,  as well as Suffolk County on Eastern Long Island and Staten Island. Despite the imbalance in registration, New York voters have shown a willingness to elect relatively centrist Republicans to local offices, though not in the Presidential election.

New York is near unique among the states in that it allows electoral fusion (cross-endorsement). As a result, New York ballots tend to list many political parties. The endorsement of major party candidates by smaller parties can be important since smaller parties often use this ballot feature to offer a candidate an additional line on the ballot.

In a 2020 study, New York was ranked as the 17th easiest state for citizens to vote in.

Electoral system

Electoral procedure
Primary elections are elections at which enrolled members of a party nominate party candidates for the general election and elect party officers. New York uses closed primaries and only an enrolled member of a party can vote in its primaries. The election district is the basic electoral administrative division, containing a maximum of 950 registered voters (although it may be as large as 1150 registered voters between redistricting) with boundaries determined by the local board of elections.

The person for party nomination for public office who receives a plurality of the vote is nominated as the party candidate.  The state central committee of a political party designates people for statewide public offices in the primary election by majority vote, but people who receive at least 25% of the committee votes may contest the primary, and people who receive less than 25% of the committee votes may contest the primary by collecting 25000 petition signatures with at least 100 signatories from each congressional district.

The political party county executive committees in cities and towns and the party caucus in villages typically select candidates for local offices, with the local committees ratifying the selections. In New York City, candidates for the citywide offices are designated jointly by the five county executive committees of each party, and a local political club (which is not an official party organization) may also play a major role in nomination and selection. Judicial nominating conventions, composed of judicial delegates elected from assembly districts within the judicial district, nominate New York Supreme Court justices. The designation of a person to contest a party nomination for public office, and the nomination of a person for a party office, at a primary election is by designating petition.

General elections are held in November in even-numbered years for state offices, in November in odd-numbered years for city and town offices, and in March or June in odd-numbered years for villages offices (unless the village board selects a different date).

New York is near unique among the states in that it allows electoral fusion (cross-endorsement), allowing two or more parties to nominate the same person for office. Absentee ballots are allowed for voters who are away from their residence on election day, ill, or physically disabled. The minimum age for suffrage is eighteen years old. Individuals who have been convicted of a felony are disenfranchised while incarcerated or on parole; individuals on probation retain the right to vote. Local boards of elections are required to hold voter registration between the sixth and fourth Saturday before a general election. Voter registration at local boards of elections is closed for thirty days before a general election; voter registration at polling places begins thirty days after a general election, and for ten days before and five days after other elections. Voter registration by mail is allowed. Voters may choose to enroll in a political party during voter registration.

Party system

Parties that received at least 130,000 votes or 2% of the vote in the previous gubernatorial election or presidential election qualify for "official" status and automatic statewide ballot access. This also determines the order on the ballot. There are a number of minor parties in New York State which do not qualify for ballot status.

The Election Law defines the structure of political parties and requires each party to have county committees and a state committee. The county committees are composed of at least two members elected from each election district, as well as two members elected from each assembly district within the county (district leaders). In the five counties of New York City, the executive committees of the county committees are composed of the district leaders and other officers; outside New York City, the executive committees are composed of the chairmen of the local political committees (of each city, town, and village within the county, composed of county committee members from those localities) and other officers. In principle, county committee members select the county committee chair, but in New York City the practice is that the district leaders control the choice. Judicial nominating conventions, which nominate New York Supreme Court justices, are composed of judicial delegates elected from assembly districts within the judicial district.

The state committees are in practice composed of members determined by county committee chairmen augmented by representatives of other constituency groups according to party bylaws. In principle, a chairperson and executive committee are chosen by the state committee, although in practice a sitting governor of the party will effectively name the chairperson. The state committee chairperson and executive committee select one man and one woman for the national committee, select at-large delegates and chairpersons for the national convention, select candidates for statewide offices, and conduct party activities.

Reform 

A 2005 study by the Grassroots Initiative found that in New York City more than 50% of committee membership was vacant and that 98% of committee member elections were uncontested. In suburban and rural areas, informed observers estimate that at least one-third of committee membership is vacant. New York's judicial conventions have also been criticized as opaque, brief, and dominated by county party leaders.

State electoral history

Elected offices

The Governor, Lieutenant Governor, Attorney General, State Comptroller and the two U.S. senators are now the only statewide elected officials. The first state election was held in June 1777, and the Governor and Lieutenant Governor were the only statewide elected officials. Besides them, the Assemblymen were elected in the counties, and the state senators in the senatorial districts.

Until 1821 a state election was held annually, lasting three days, beginning on the last Monday in April. The Assembly was completely and the Senate partly renewed. Every three years, a Governor and a Lieutenant Governor were elected, all other state officials were appointed by the Council of Appointments. From 1822 to 1841, the state elections have been held lasting three days, beginning on the first Monday in November. The Governor and the Lieutenant Governor continued to be the only statewide elected officials. Since November 1842, the election has been held on a single day, the date fixed on the Tuesday after the first Monday in November (the date thus ranging from November 2 to 8). In 1844, four Canal Commissioners were also elected statewide. In 1846, the Governor, Lieutenant Governor, and two Canal Commissioners were elected. All other statewide officials were elected by joint ballot of the state legislature .

The Constitution of 1846 made most of the state offices elective by popular ballot. From 1847 on, the Governor, Lieutenant Governor, Secretary of State, Attorney General, State Comptroller, State Treasurer, State Engineer, three Canal Commissioners, three Prison Inspectors, four judges and the Clerk of the New York Court of Appeals were elected statewide with different terms in office.

From 1870 on, a Chief Judge and six associate judges of the Court of Appeals were elected, and since then the Clerk of the Court of Appeals has been appointed by the Court. In 1876, the offices of Canal Commissioner and Inspector of State Prisons were abolished, and their successors were appointed by the governor. From 1914 on, the U.S. senators from New York were elected statewide too. The offices of the Treasurer and the State Engineer were abolished in 1926. The office of Secretary of State became appointive by the Governor in 1927. Since 1938, the legislative term is two years for both state senators and assemblymen, so that state elections are held now only in even-numbered years. Until 1973, judges of the Court of Appeals were occasionally elected in odd-numbered years, and the judges of the New York Court of Appeals became appointed in 1978.

Party trends and geography

The balance of the parties was formerly less decided, with a large Democratic majority in populous New York City, Rochester and Buffalo, but Republican dominance in the upstate and the eastern part of Long Island. Historically, the only Democratic outpost in upstate New York was Albany. In recent years, with the political transformation of former Republican strongholds of Long Island, the Hudson Valley and the Syracuse area, New York has grown more reliably Democratic. In particular, Westchester County currently has a Democratic county legislature for only the second time in three decades.

Unlike most states, New York electoral law permits electoral fusion; thus New York ballots tend to show a larger number of parties.  Some are permanent minor parties that seek to influence the major parties, while others are ephemeral parties formed to give major-party candidates an additional line on the ballot.

The total (active plus inactive) enrolment of the various parties in New York State is as follows, according to the New York State Board of Elections report of Enrolment by County dated 1 November 2020. Percentages are of the total with a declared affiliation.  Each party will also have the equivalent increase or decrease to the results of 1 November 2016.

Party balance in state legislatures
Democrats hold a 54-seat supermajority in the Assembly, whose current speaker is Carl Heastie. They have been in the majority since 1975 and for all but five years since 1959.

The Assembly has long been controlled by the Democrats, the Senate by the Republicans, and there was little change in membership in elections until those of 2008. As a result, decisions are taken when "three men in a room"—the Senate Majority Leader, the Speaker of the Assembly, and the Governor—agree. For many years the legislature was unable to pass legislation for which there was supposed to be a consensus, such as reforming the so-called Rockefeller drug laws.

The Republicans controlled the State Senate from 1939 until 2009, with the exception of a brief period in 1965. However, in 2008, the Democrats won a narrow two-seat majority in the State Senate. Malcolm Smith of Queens became the new Senate Majority Leader, and he also doubles as acting Lieutenant Governor by virtue of David Paterson ascending to the governorship. Smith replaced Paterson as leader of the Democrats in the State Senate upon Paterson's election as Lieutenant Governor. The Minority Leader is Dean Skelos of Nassau County. After a brief period in June and July 2009 in which Republicans regained control of the chamber, Democrats chose Pedro Espada Jr. of the Bronx who flipped to the Republicans as their new Majority Leader in order to regain control. John L. Sampson of Brooklyn became the Democratic conference leader, while Malcolm Smith retained his position as President Pro Tempore, and acting Lieutenant Governor.

While the Assembly's apportionment strongly favors New York City, Buffalo, Rochester, and the Capital District, the Senate's apportionment typically favored the more conservative Upstate. However, the Republicans have lost many Senate seats in recent years because of the aforementioned political realignments of the New York City suburbs, Long Island and Syracuse. This enabled Democrats to reclaim the chamber in 2019 and obtain a 2/3rds supermajority since 2021.

Referendums
Every 20 years, the Constitution of the State of New York requires that a statewide referendum be held on whether to convene a constitutional convention. The next such referendum is scheduled for 2037. If a convention is approved, a special legislative house is established the year following, with delegates chosen both at large and from each Senate district.

A positive vote in a referendum is also required for any amendment to the state constitution, whether passed by the regular legislature or by a constitutional convention.

Federal electoral history
New York State has voted Democratic in national elections since 1988. However, New York City has been the most important source of political fund-raising in the United States for both major parties. Four of the top five zip codes in the nation for political contributions are in Manhattan. The top zip code, 10021 on the Upper East Side, generated the most money for the 2000 presidential campaigns of both George Bush and Al Gore. Republican Presidential candidates have often skipped campaigning in the state, taking it as a loss and focusing on vital swing states.

Many of the state's other urban areas, including Albany, Ithaca, Buffalo, Rochester, and Syracuse are also Democratic. Upstate New York, especially in rural areas, is generally more conservative than the cities and historically tended to vote Republican, although Democrats have made dramatic gains upstate in recent elections, and today the region is much more evenly split. Heavily populated suburban areas such as Westchester County and Long Island have swung from reliably Republican to unreliably Democratic in federal elections over the past 25 years, although local races there are still often tightly contested.

Democrats Al Smith, Franklin Delano Roosevelt and W. Averell Harriman served as governor, as did Republicans Thomas Dewey and Nelson Rockefeller, who was elected four times. Progressive Republican Theodore Roosevelt was Governor of New York before being elected Vice President in 1900.

Congressional delegation
New York's delegation to the US House of Representatives is composed mostly of Democrats. Republicans have not held a majority of New York US House seats since the 1965. This is due almost entirely to the Democrats' near-total domination of local elections in New York City, which contains 12 of the state's 26 districts. Historically, Republicans had a chance to win three NYC districts. However, aside from Staten Island, Republican candidates have not won any city district since the early 1990s.

With the defeats of Republican incumbents Sue Kelly and John Sweeney and a Democratic victory in the open seat of Sherwood Boehlert in 2006, New York sent 23 Democrats and six Republicans to the 110th Congress. Two years later, Randy Kuhl was unseated by Eric Massa in the 29th District, and Dan Maffei won the seat of retiring Jim Walsh in the Syracuse area. As a result, New York's congressional delegation consisted of 26 Democrats and three Republicans at the start of the 111th Congress. The three Republicans were the fewest to have ever represented New York in the House, and only a fourth of the number New York sent to that body only a decade earlier. In November 2009, Democrat Bill Owens won a special election for a North Country seat previously held by Republican John McHugh, who resigned to become Secretary of the Army, bringing the delegation to 27 Democrats and 2 Republicans. In addition to holding every seat in New York City, Democrats held all but one seat on Long Island and every House seat in the Hudson Valley. However, in 2010, the Republicans gained 6 seats, all of which had been picked up by Democrats in 2006 or 2008. Five were in Upstate New York, and one was on Staten Island. They also came within a few hundred votes of unseating 1st district incumbent Tim Bishop of Suffolk County. In 2011, Democrat Kathy Hochul won a special election in New York's 26th congressional district, which means that at every seat, with the exception of the Long Island-based 2nd congressional district (which was numbered as the 3rd prior to the 2011 redistricting), has elected a Democratic representative at least once since 2006.

New York lost two congressional districts as a result of the 2010 census, and the 2012 elections resulted in the balance of the delegation being 21 Democrats and 6 Republicans; Democrats Dan Maffei and Sean Patrick Maloney respectively unseated Republican incumbents Ann Marie Buerkle and Nan Hayworth in the 24th, centered in Syracuse, and the 18th, in the Hudson Valley, while Republican Chris Collins defeated Hochul in western New York's 27th. Republicans made gains in 2014, defeating two incumbents and picking up one open seat. After no changes in 2016, Democrats defeated three Republican incumbents in 2018, as Max Rose won the Staten Island district, while Anthony Brindisi and Antonio Delgado were respectively elected to seats in Central New York and in the Hudson Valley. Notably, the three districts that flipped from Republican to Democratic in 2018 had all been won by Donald Trump two years earlier, however, Democrats then lost two of those seats in 2020. Democrats did suffer significant losses in New York in the 2022 elections, despite a red wave not occurring in much of the rest of the United States. Democrats were reduced to a 15-11 majority in the delegation, were completely shut out of Long Island, and held just four seats outside of New York City proper.

This recent Democratic dominance may be explained by the exodus of non-Hispanic white voters to other parts of the country, in addition to the large influx of predominately Hispanic minorities to the state. With few exceptions, upstate New York and Long Island have historically been dominated by a moderate brand of Republicanism, similar to that of neighboring New England. Since the early 1990s, many voters in traditional Republican strongholds such as Long Island, Syracuse, and the Hudson Valley have voted for Democratic candidates at the national level. In addition to New York City, Democrats continue to do well around Rochester, Albany, and Buffalo, as they have done since the 1930s. New York City, for instance, has not been carried by a Republican presidential candidate since 1924.

U.S. senators
Currently, New York is represented in the U.S. Senate by Chuck Schumer of Brooklyn and Kirsten Gillibrand of Columbia County, both Democrats.

Over the last five decades, New York has elected Democratic Senators Daniel Patrick Moynihan, Robert F. Kennedy, and Hillary Clinton as well as Republican Senators Jacob K. Javits, Alfonse D'Amato and Conservative Senator James Buckley. New York politics have recently been dominated by downstate areas such as Westchester County, New York City and Long Island, where a majority of the state's population resides. Before the appointment of Kirsten Gillibrand to the Senate in 2009, the most recent US Senator from upstate was Charles Goodell, appointed to fill out the remainder of Robert F. Kennedy's term, serving from 1968 to 1971. Goodell was from (Jamestown). Before the election of Kirsten Gillibrand in 2010, the last senator from upstate to be elected was Kenneth Keating of Rochester, in 1958.

Schumer's victory over Republican Alfonse D'Amato in 1998 gave the Democrats both of the state's Senate seats for the first time since 1947. In 2004, conservative Michael Benjamin battled with the New York Republican State Committee for a chance to run against Schumer, which decided in August 2004 there would be no primary and selected moderate Assemblyman Howard Mills as the Republican candidate. Benjamin publicly accused New York GOP Chairman Sandy Treadwell and Governor George Pataki of trying to muscle him out of the Senate race and undermine the democratic process. Many Republican voters were upset when Benjamin was denied the chance to engage in a primary. Benjamin also had significant advantages over Mills in both fundraising and organization. Schumer won the largest victory ever recorded for a candidate running statewide in New York against Mills, carrying all but one of the state's counties.

Many New York Republicans were irked again in 2006 when a similar situation unfolded as the state party decided to nominate Westchester County District Attorney Jeanine Pirro over conservative lawyer Ed Cox, even though Cox had raised over $1.3 million  to Pirro's $400,000. In 2006, Clinton won the third largest victory ever recorded statewide, carrying all but four counties. In both cases, Schumer and Clinton didn't face serious opposition.

New York's Democratic tilt also continued into 2010, even when Democrats were suffering heavy losses all around the country. Chuck Schumer easily defeated Jay Townsend to win a third term in the U.S. Senate with 66 percent of the vote. With both Senate seats up in New York, the media was more focused on the Class I seat because when Kirsten Gillibrand was first appointed in 2009, she initially looked very vulnerable due of her A+ rating from the NRA from when she was representing a rural upstate district. That rating was not well received by downstate residents when she was first appointed to the Senate. Then Gillibrand immediately changed her position on the issue of gun control after she was appointed to satisfy the concerns from downstate residents. She then went on to win the special election easily with 62 percent of the vote in 2010. In 2012, Gillibrand was re-elected in a landslide with more than 72% of the vote, the highest statewide vote share ever received by a senatorial candidate in New York State.

Presidential elections

Throughout most of the 20th century, New York was a powerful swing state, forcing presidential candidates to invest a large amount of money and time campaigning there. New York State gave small margins of victory to Democrats John F. Kennedy in 1960, Hubert Humphrey in 1968, Jimmy Carter in 1976 and Michael Dukakis in 1988, as well as Republicans Herbert Hoover in 1928, Thomas Dewey in 1948 and Ronald Reagan in 1980. Until the 1970 United States Census, it had the most votes in the U.S. Electoral College. 

Today, although New York is still the fourth largest prize in the Electoral College with 28 votes, it is usually considered an uncontested "blue state"—meaning that it is presumed safe for the Democrats. The last time a Republican made a serious effort in the state was George H. W. Bush in 1988. Since 1992, the national Republican Party has effectively ceded New York to the Democrats. John Kerry won New York State by 18 percentage points in 2004, while Al Gore won by an even greater 25-point margin in New York State in 2000, giving Gore his second-highest total in the nation. Bill Clinton twice scored his third-best performance in New York in 1992 and 1996. In the 2008 presidential election Barack Obama carried New York with 62.9% of the vote, making it the third most Democratic state in that election, surpassed only by Hawaii and Vermont, as well as the District of Columbia. In 2012, Obama carried New York by an even greater margin, taking 63.4% of the vote to Republican Mitt Romney's 35.2%, again making it the third most Democratic state in the nation.

Even in the days when New York was considered a swing state, it had a slight Democratic lean. It has only supported a Republican for president six times since the Great Depression—in 1948, 1952, 1956, 1972, 1980 and 1984. Republicans have to do reasonably well in Buffalo, Syracuse and Rochester while holding down their deficits in New York City to have a realistic chance of carrying the state. New York has not voted Republican since Ronald Reagan in the 1984 election (53% - 45%).

See also
 2021 New York state elections

Statewide elections 
 New York gubernatorial elections
 New York Attorney General elections
 New York Comptroller elections
 United States senators from New York

Local elections 
 New York City mayoral elections

Topics 
 Political party strength in New York
 Politics of New York
 Electoral reform in New York

Notes

Further reading
Paterson, David "Black, Blind, & In Charge: A Story of Visionary Leadership and Overcoming Adversity." Skyhorse Publishing. New York, New York, 2020

External links 
New York State Board of Elections

Election statistics from the Office of the Clerk of the United States House of Representatives
 

 
Government of New York (state)
Political events in New York (state)